The North Bothnia Line is a planned high-speed railway line between Umeå Central Station and Luleå Central Station in Sweden. The planned extension is expected to improve accessibility between larger cities along Sweden's coast and handle 1.6 million passengers per year.

Currently, the area is served by the Main Line Through Upper Norrland, which is located inland and with branch lines connected to various towns along the coast. To the north, the line will connect with the Main Line Through Upper Norrland and onwards along the Haparanda Line to connect to the Barents Region and the Finnish railway network. It will also connect to the Iron Ore Line. The project is estimated to cost 23 billion Swedish kronor (SEK).

The line will connect to Stockholm via the Bothnia Line, the Ådalen Line and the East Coast Line. An upgrade of the Main Line has been considered, but because of the curvy right-of-way most of the line would have to be built in an all-new right-of-way, which would raise costs to about the same as the North Bothnia Line. In addition, the Main Line's inland route makes it unsuitable for regional passenger services and gives longer distances. Travel time from Umeå to Luleå for passenger trains will be 90 minutes, compared to over 4 hours for buses or trains today.

The first part of the line to be built is a  section from Umeå to Dåva industrial area, where construction started on 23 August 2018, with opening for traffic scheduled for 2024. As of 2022, the rest of the Umeå–Skellefteå half is under advanced planning, while studies for Skellefteå–Luleå began in 2021.

References

External links

High-speed railway lines in Sweden
Proposed public transport in Sweden
Rail transport in Norrbotten County
Rail transport in Västerbotten County